Amauropsis anderssoni is a species of predatory sea snail, a marine gastropod mollusk in the family Naticidae, the moon snails.

Description
The maximum recorded shell length is 22.7 mm.

Habitat
Minimum recorded depth is 15 m. Maximum recorded depth is 567 m.

References

Naticidae
Gastropods described in 1906